Tarsopterella is a genus of prehistoric eurypterid classified within the family Hardieopteridae. It contains only one species, T. scotica from the Lower Devonian of Scotland.

Description 
Tarsopterella is distinguished by its prosoma (head), which is subrectangular and slightly concave in front, with small compound eyes.  Its abdomen has pronounced lateral epimera (marginal spines similar to those of horseshoe crabs).  Tarsopterella dates from the Lower Devonian period.

References

Stylonurina
Devonian eurypterids
Prehistoric life of Europe
Eurypterids of Europe